{{Infobox deity
| Devanagari = वसुदेव
| type = Hindu
| image = 
| caption = Vasudeva carrying the newborn Krishna to Nanda's house in Gokula across the river Yamuna
| spouse = Rohini, Devaki, and various other wives
| children = Balarama, Krishna, Subhadra, and various other children
| father = 
| mother = 
| dynasty = Yaduvamsha-Chandravamsha
| texts = Bhagavata Purana, Harivamsa, Vishnu Purana, Brahma Purana, Mahabharata| 
| venerated_in = Vaishnavism
}}

According to Hindu scriptures, Vasudeva (Sanskrit: वसुदेव, IAST: Vasudeva), also called Anakadundubhi (anakas and dundubhis both refer to drums, after the musicians who played these instruments at the time of his birth), is the father of the Hindu deities Krishna (Vāsudeva, i.e. "son of Vasudeva"), Balarama, and Subhadra. He was a king of the Vrishnis, and a Yadava prince. The son of the Yadava king Shurasena, he was also the cousin of Nanda, the foster-father of Krishna. His sister Kunti was married to Pandu. 

The patronymic  (with a pronounced ā) is a popular name of Krishna, the son of Vasudeva and Devaki. "Vāsudeva" is a vṛddhi, a derivative of the short form "Vasudeva", a linguistic pragmatic in Sanskrit signifying "of, belonging to, descended from". "Vasudeva" as an object of worship in Hinduism usually refers to the son  (Krishna), rather than his father Vasudeva.

Family
Vasudeva was born to the Yadava king Shurasena in the Surasena kingdom. Vasudeva had many brothers such as Devashrava and Devabhaga, and sisters such as Kunti (mother of the Pandavas), Shrutasravas (mother of Shishupala), and others. According to the Harivamsa Purana, Vasudeva and Nanda, the Kshatriya chief of Gokula, were brothers or cousins.

Wives and children
Vasudeva married Devaki, and also had other wives such as Pauravi (daughter of Bahlika), Rohini, Bhadra, Madira and Vrikadevi. Rohini bore several sons, namely, Balarama, Sarana and Shatha. Vrikadevi gave birth to Avagaha and Nandaka. By Devaki, he had eight sons - six of whom were killed by Kamsa and the other two being Balarama (transferred into the womb of Rohini) and Krishna. He also had a daughter - Subhadra from Rohini. In some versions of the Bhagavata Purana, Vasudeva also married Sutanu, the princess of Kasi, and they had a son named Paundraka.

Descendants
Vasudeva traced a number of descendants through his sons. Sarana had many sons like Satyadhriti and Marsti, and Shatha had a son called Sarthi. Balarama married Revati and had 2 sons - Nishatha and Ulmuka & a daughter - Vatsala/Shashirekha. Krishna had 8 principal wives, and he begat many children from them, such as Pradyumna, Samba, Bhanu etc., and they also had many children. Vasudeva's daughter Subhadra married Pandava prince Arjuna, and they had a son Abhimanyu. Ultimately, it was Abhimanyu's son Parikshit who ascended the Kuru throne after Yudhishthira.

Many of the Yadavas killed themselves in the Yadava fratricide. Krishna, Balarama and Vasudeva later gave up their lives, and the Pandavas collected the remaining Yadava children and ladies with them to Indraprastha, where Pradyumma's grandson Vajra was crowned as king of Mathura, and some other survivors also were crowned as kings of different places (See Mausala Parva).

The sons of Vasudeva were related to Bhagavatism that was largely formed by the 1st-millennium BCE where Vāsudeva (Krishna, the son of Vasudeva) was worshiped as supreme ultimate reality. This is evidenced by texts and archaeological evidence. As textual evidence, the Mahanarayana Upanishad records the verse:

This verse asserts that Narayana, Vāsudeva (Krishna), and Vishnu are synonymous. The author and the century in which the above Mahanarayana Upanishad was composed is unknown. The relative chronology of the text, based on its poetic verse and textual style, has been proposed by Parmeshwaranand to the same period of composition as Katha, Isha, Mundaka and Shvetashvatara Upanishads, but before Maitri, Prashna and Mandukya Upanishad. Feuerstein places the relative composition chronology of Mahanarayana to be about that of Mundaka and Prashna Upanishads. These relative chronology estimates date the text to second half of 1st millennium BCE. Srinivasan suggests a later date for the composition of the Mahanarayana Upanishad, one after about 300 BCE and probably in the centuries around the start of the common era.

Other evidence is from archeological inscriptions, where Bhagavan is documented epigraphically to be from around 100 BCE, such as in the inscriptions of the Heliodorus pillar. An Indo-Greek ambassador from Taxila named Heliodorus, of this era, visited the court of a Shunga king, and addresses himself as a Bhagavata on this pillar, an epithet scholars consider as evidence of Vāsudeva worship was well established in 1st millennium BCE. A popular short prayer for worshipping Vāsudeva is Dwadashaakshar.
Kashyapa incarnated as Vasudeva
Sage Kashyapa is said to have incarnated as Vasudeva, the father of Krishna, due to a curse of the deities Varuna or Brahma. 

Once, the sage is said to have performed a yajna (a ritual sacrifice) in his hermitage. Kashyapa sought the help of the god Varuna for the offerings of milk and ghee. Varuna lent the sage a divine cow that would provide him the required offerings. After completing the sacrifice, Kashyapa delayed in returning the cow back to the deity. Varuna cursed the sage and his wife, Aditi, to be born on earth as Vasudeva and Devaki, the parents of Vishnu in his avatar of Krishna.

In other iterations, Kashyapa is stated to have stolen a divine cow from Varuna for the performance of a ritual sacrifice. The deity requested Brahma for his intervention. For his theft of a cow, Brahma cursed Kashyapa to be born on earth as a cowherd. Since his wives, Aditi and Surasa, had assisted him in concealing the cows in his hermitage, they were also born on earth as his two wives, Devaki and Rohini.

See also

 Heliodorus pillar
 Hathibada Ghosundi Inscriptions
 Naneghat
 Vasu Doorjamb Inscription
 Vasudeva Upanishad

References

References
 

 

Further reading
RG Bhandarkar: "Vasudeva of Panini" 4.3.98. Journal of the Royal Asiatic Society'', 1910.

People related to Krishna
Characters in the Mahabharata
Characters in the Bhagavata Purana